Gatewood House may refer to:

in the United States (by state):
Gatewood House (Malvern, Arkansas), listed on the NRHP in Hot Spring County, Arkansas
Gatewood House (San Diego, California), a registered Historic Landmark of San Diego
Gatewood House (Eatonton, Georgia), listed on the NRHP in Georgia
Gatewood (Gallipolis, Ohio), listed on the NRHP in Gallia County, Ohio
McGavock-Gatewood-Webb House, Nashville, Tennessee, listed on the NRHP in Davidson County, Tennessee

See also
 Gatewood (disambiguation)